The Women's Allam British Open 2016 is the women's edition of the 2016 British Open Squash Championships, which is a PSA World Series event (prize money: $130 000). The event took place at the Sports Arena in Hull in the England from 21 to 27 March. Nour El Sherbini won her first British Open trophy, beating Nouran Gohar in the final.

Prize money and ranking points 
For 2016, the prize purse was of $130,000. The prize money and points breakdown is as follows:

Seeds

Draw and results

See also 
2015–16 PSA World Series
2016 Men's British Open

References

External links 
PSA British Open 2016 website
British Open 2016 official website

Women's British Open Squash Championships
Women's British Open
Women's British Open Squash Championship
Squash in England
Sport in Kingston upon Hull
2010s in Kingston upon Hull
Brit
Women's British Open Squash Championship